Varam is a 1993 Indian Malayalam film, directed by Haridas and produced by Hamsa Muhammed. The film stars Mukesh, Mohini, Sukumari and Thilakan in the lead roles. The film has musical score by Ouseppachan.

Cast
Mukesh as Eby Perera
Mohini as Neelima
Sukumari as Neelima's Aunt
Thilakan as Dr. Uncle
A. C. Zainuddin as Peter Fernadez
Ganesh Kumar as Daniel Dizuza
Janardanan as Gangadhara Menon (Neelima's Father)
Mamukkoya as patient
Beena Antony as Leena (Neelima's Friend)

Soundtrack
The music was composed by Ouseppachan and the lyrics were written by Gireesh Puthenchery.

References

1993 films
1990s Malayalam-language films
Films scored by Ouseppachan